Indian Drugs and Pharmaceuticals Limited (IDPL) is a public sector pharmaceutical, bulk drug manufacturing and drug discovery company owned by the Indian government, headquartered in New Delhi, and located in Hyderabad, Gurgaon and Rishikesh.: The company is involved in patent development alongside, National Institute of Pharmaceutical Education and Research to provide affordable drugs, and has recently released three over the counter drugs.

A new formulation unit was inaugurated in Hyderabad in February 2017.

Many attempts have been made to revive IDPL, declared sick by the Board for Industrial and Financial Reconstruction. The Government of India is exploring ways of strategically selling the unit and meet outstanding liabilities. On the 9th of February 2021, the Government of India announced the liquidation of IDPL.

See also
National Institute of Pharmaceutical Education and Research, Hyderabad
Pharmaceuticals in India
Dr. Reddy's Laboratories
Genome Valley

References

Pharmaceutical companies of India
Government-owned companies of India
Industries in Hyderabad, India
Pharmaceutical companies established in 1961